is a Japanese voice actress from Chiba Prefecture, and affiliated with 81 Produce. Her major roles include Fake Yuna and Miki Shiratori in Galaxy Fraulein Yuna, Neko Musume in GeGeGe no Kitaro, Junsa (Officer Jenny) in Pokémon, Reika Aoki/Cure Beauty in Smile PreCure!, Yu Fua in Duel Masters, Kiyone Kotetsu in Bleach, and President Aria Pokoteng in Aria. In video games, she voices Kanna in the Air visual novel, and Cheryl in Arc the Lad III.

Filmography

Anime

Film

Video games

Drama CD

Other dubbing

References

External links
 Official agency profile 
 

1970 births
Living people
Voice actresses from Chiba Prefecture
81 Produce voice actors
Japanese voice actresses